Antonov State Enterprise, formerly the Aeronautical Scientific-Technical Complex named after Antonov (Antonov ASTC), and earlier the Antonov Design Bureau, for its chief designer, Oleg Antonov, is a Ukrainian aircraft manufacturing and services company. Antonov's particular expertise is in the fields of very large aeroplanes and aeroplanes using unprepared runways. Antonov (model prefix "An-") has built a total of approximately 22,000 aircraft, and thousands of its planes are operating in the former Soviet Union and in developing countries.

Antonov StC is a state-owned commercial company. Its headquarters and main industrial grounds were originally located in Novosibirsk, and in 1952 were transferred to Kyiv. On 12 May 2015 it was transferred from the Ministry of Economic Development and Trade to the Ukroboronprom (Ukrainian Defense Industry).

In June 2016, Ukraine's major state-owned arms manufacturer Ukroboronprom announced the creation of the Ukrainian Aircraft Corporation within its structure, to combine all aircraft manufacturing enterprises in Ukraine.

History

Soviet era

Foundation and relocation
The company was established in 1946 at the Novosibirsk Aircraft Production Association as the top-secret Soviet Research and Design Bureau No. 153 (OKB-153). It was headed by Oleg Antonov and specialised in turboprop military transport aircraft. The task was to create an agricultural aircraft CX-1 (An-2), the first flight of which occurred on August 31, 1947. The An-2 biplane was a major achievement of this period, with hundreds of these aircraft still operating as of 2013. In addition to this biplane and its modifications, a small series of gliders A-9 and A-10 were created and built in the pilot production in Novosibirsk. In 1952, the Bureau was relocated to Kyiv, a city with a rich aviation history and an aircraft-manufacturing infrastructure restored after the destruction caused by World War II.

First serial aircraft and expansion

The 1957 introduction of the An-10/An-12 family of mid-range turboprop aeroplanes began the successful production of thousands of these aircraft. Their use for both heavy combat and civilian purposes around the globe continues to the present; the An-10/An-12 were used most notably in the Vietnam War, the Soviet–Afghan War and the Chernobyl disaster relief megaoperation.

In 1959, the bureau began construction of the separate Flight Testing and Improvement Base in suburban Hostomel (now the Antonov Airport).

In 1965, the Antonov An-22 heavy military transport entered serial production to supplement the An-12 in major military and humanitarian airlifts by the Soviet Union. The model became the first Soviet wide-body aircraft, and it remains the world's largest turboprop-powered aircraft. Antonov designed and presented a nuclear-powered version of the An-22. It was never flight tested.

In 1966, after the major expansion in the Sviatoshyn neighbourhood of the city, the company was renamed to another disguise name: "Kyiv Mechanical Plant". Two independent aircraft production and repair facilities, under engineering-supervision of the Antonov Bureau, also appeared in Kyiv during this period.

Prominence and Antonov's retirement

In the 1970s and early 1980s, the company established itself as the Soviet Union's main designer of military transport aircraft with dozens of new modifications in development and production. After Oleg Antonov's death in 1984, the company was officially renamed as the Research and Design Bureau named after O.K. Antonov while continuing the use of "Kyiv Mechanical Plant" alias for some purposes.

Late Soviet-era: superlarge projects and first commercialisation

In the late 1980s, the Antonov Bureau achieved global prominence after the introduction of its extra large aeroplanes. The An-124 "Ruslan" (1982) became the Soviet Union's mass-produced strategic airlifter under the leadership of Chief Designer Viktor Tolmachev. The Bureau enlarged the "Ruslan" design even more for the Soviet spaceplane programme logistics, creating the An-225 "Mriya" in 1985. "Mriya" was the world's largest and heaviest aeroplane.

The end of the Cold War and perestroika allowed the Antonov company's first step to commercialisation and foreign expansion. In 1989, the Antonov Airlines subsidiary was created for its own aircraft maintenance and cargo projects.

Independent Ukraine

Antonov Design Bureau remained a state-owned company after Ukraine achieved its independence in 1991 and is since regarded as a strategic national asset.

Expansion to free market

Since independence, Antonov has certified and marketed both Soviet-era and newly developed models for sale in new markets outside of the former soviet-sphere of influence. New models introduced to serial production and delivered to customers include the Antonov An-140, Antonov An-148 and Antonov An-158 regional airliners.

Among several modernisation projects, Antonov received orders for upgrading "hundreds" of its legendary An-2 utility planes still in operation in Azerbaijan, Cuba and Russia to the An-2-100 upgrade version.

In 2014, following the annexation of the Crimea by Russia, Ukraine cancelled contracts with Russia, leading to a significant income reduction in Ukraine's defense and aviation industries. However Ukraine has been slowly recovering the deficit from breaking ties with Russia by entering new markets such as the Persian Gulf region and expanding its presence in old ones such as India.

In July 2018, Antonov was able to secure a deal with Boeing in order to procure airplane parts which were no longer available due to breakdown of relations with Russia.

Production facilities' consolidation
During the Soviet period, not all Antonov-designed aircraft were manufactured by the company itself. This was a result of Soviet industrial strategy that split military production between different regions of the Soviet Union to minimise potential war loss risks. As a result, Antonov aeroplanes were often assembled by the specialist contract manufacturers.

In 2009, the once-independent "Aviant" aeroplane-assembling plant in Kyiv became part of Antonov, facilitating a full serial manufacturing cycle of the company. However, the old tradition of co-manufacturing with contractors is continued, both with Soviet-time partners and with new licensees like Iran's Iran Aircraft Manufacturing Industrial Company.

In 2014, the Antonov produced and delivered only two An-158 airplanes. This trend continued onto 2015, producing one An-148 and one An-158. Since 2016, no aircraft have been produced or delivered to clients.

In June 2016, Ukraine's major state-owned arms manufacturer Ukroboronprom announced the creation of the Ukrainian Aircraft Corporation within its structure, thereby combining all aircraft manufacturing enterprises, including the assets of Antonov into a single cluster, according to Ukroboronprom's press service.

On 19 July 2017, the Ukrainian government approved the liquidation of Antonov's assets. The State Concern "Antonov" (a business group, created in 2005 from the merger of several legally independent companies into a single economic entity under unified management) will be liquidated as a residual corporate entity. Antonov State Company, Kharkiv State Aviation Manufacturing Enterprise and Plant No.410 of Civil Aviation were transferred under the management of another state-owned concern Ukroboronprom in 2015. Antonov State Company continues to function as an enterprise.

Composition
Antonov Serial Production Plant (formerly Kyiv Aviation Factory "Aviant") – Kyiv
Kharkiv Aviation Factory – Kharkiv
Antonov – Kyiv
Civil Aviation Factory 441 – Kyiv

Airfields
 Sviatoshyn Airfield, Aviant factory in Kyiv
 Hostomel Airport, freight airport in Hostomel

Products and activities

Fields of commercial activity of Antonov ASTC include:
 Aircraft design and manufacturing
 Cargo air transport (Antonov Airlines)
 Aircraft maintenance, testing, certification and upgrading
 Aerospace-related research and engineering
 "Aerial Launch": a joint Russian-Ukrainian project of midair spacecraft space launch from aboard a modified version of the An-225.
 Operation of the Hostomel airport (Antonov Airport)
 Medium-capacity rail transport system RADAN
 Construction of LT-10A trams (with aluminium body)
 Construction and manufacturing of Kiev-12 trolley buses (a spin-off, using existing technical expertise).

Major contractors and partners

Contract and licensee manufacturers
Tashkent Aviation Production Association (formerly Tashkent State Aviation Plant) – Tashkent, Uzbekistan
Iran Aircraft Manufacturing Industrial Company (HESA) – Shahin Shahr, Iran
Voronezh Aircraft Production Association (VASO) – Voronezh, Russia

Chief designers
 Oleg Antonov: 1946–1984
 Petro Balabuiev: 1984–2005
 Dmytro Kiva: since 2005

Aircraft
Antonov's primary activity has generally been in developing large military transport aircraft, including the world's largest airplanes, chiefly for the Russian Federation and its predecessor nations.

Additionally, Antonov has produced airliners. It has also produced numerous variants of both transports and airliners, for operations ranging from air freight hauling to military reconnaissance, command and control operations.

It has also developed various general aviation light aircraft, having originated as a producer of gliders.

Transports, airliners and derivatives
Antonov's aeroplanes (design office prefix An) range from the rugged An-2 biplane through the An-28 reconnaissance aircraft to the massive An-124 Ruslan and An-225 Mriya strategic airlifters (the latter being the world's heaviest aircraft and was the only one in service).

Whilst less famous, the An-24, An-26, An-30 and An-32 family of twin turboprop, high-winged, passenger-cargo-troop transport aircraft are important for domestic/short-haul air services particularly in parts of the world once led by communist governments. The An-72/An-74 series of small jetliners is slowly replacing that fleet, and a larger An-70 freighter is under certification.

The Antonov An-148 is a new regional airliner of twin-turbofan configuration. Over 150 aircraft have been ordered since 2007. A stretched version is in development, the An-158 (from 60–70 to 90–100 passengers).

Gliders

See also

 List of military aircraft of the Soviet Union and the CIS

References

Further reading
 MacFarquhar, Neil. "Aviation Giant Is Nearly Grounded in Ukraine." The New York Times. 12 October 2014. Corrected on 12 October 2014.

External links

 Antonov company site
 Antonov company history
 Antonov company site 

 
Defence companies of Ukraine
Manufacturing companies based in Kyiv
Aircraft manufacturers of the Soviet Union
Aircraft manufacturers of Ukraine
Ukrainian brands
1946 establishments in Ukraine
Technology companies established in 1946
Vehicle manufacturing companies established in 1946
Ukrainian companies established in 1946
Bus manufacturers of Ukraine
Design bureaus